Xiantao is a sub-prefecture-level city in the east of Hubei province, China. Xiantao is the hometown of author Chi Li and entrepreneur Lei Jun.

History

Xiantao was known as Mianyang until 1986.

Geography
It is close to the provincial capital of Wuhan, and only one hour drive from the Wuhan Tianhe International Airport, Hankou Railway Station and Changjiang—Wuhan Port. The G4 Beijing–Hong Kong and Macau Expressway running and the G42 Shanghai–Chengdu Expressway cross near Xiantao city.

Administrative divisions
Xiantao administers:

Former town: Xiachabu/Xiazhabu (Hsia-cha-fou)

Climate

Demographics
As of 2006, the population of Xiantao was 1,480,100. Of this, the urban population was 593,500 and the rural population was 886,600.
As of 2016, the population of Xiantao was 1.5635 million.

Sports
Xiantao has been described as a "Gymnastics town", because it has cultivated several gymnastics champions, such as Li Xiaoshuang, Li Dashuang, and Yang Wei.

Transportation
 China National Highway 318
 Xiantao West railway station on the Wuhan–Yichang railway (Hankou-Yichang)
 Xiantao railway station on the Wuhan–Xiantao intercity railway
 Jianghan Plain railway (freight only)

Famous People

References 

Cities in Hubei
Wuhan urban agglomeration
Jianghan Plain
County-level divisions of Hubei